Zona Rental is a Caracas Metro station on Lines 4 and 5. It is a terminus of both lines. Line 4 station was opened on 19 July 2006 as part of the inaugural section of the line between Capuchinos and Zona Rental. The adjacent station is station is Parque Central. On 3 November 2015 the first section of Line 5 was opened. It consists of only two stations, Zona Rental and Bello Monte.

References

Caracas Metro stations
2006 establishments in Venezuela
Railway stations opened in 2006